Kenepuru is a primarily industrial suburb of the city of Porirua in New Zealand. It lies immediately southwest of the Porirua city centre.

Kenepuru Hospital, the main hospital complex for Porirua, is located here.

Education

It was founded in 1968.

References

External links
 Wellington SDA school

Suburbs of Porirua